Arthur Hamilton Baynes (23 March 1854 – 30 June 1942) was a Church of England priest and Bishop of Natal and Maritzburg from 1893 to 1901.

He was born in Lewisham, Kent, the son of Joseph Ash Baynes and Mary Elizabeth Beard, and following ordination in 1882 was Domestic Chaplain to the Archbishop of Canterbury, E. W. Benson, from 1888 to 1892. In 1893 he was appointed to the bishopric of Natal. During the Boer War, while Bishop of Natal, he was an army chaplain.

After returning to England from Natal, Baynes was Vicar of St Mary's Church, Nottingham, and also an Assistant Bishop of Southwell and an honorary canon of Southwell Minster from 1905 until 1913. During the First World War he was again an army chaplain. From 1913, he was incumbent of Birmingham Cathedral, first as Vicar, then (from 1931) as Provost of Birmingham (and an Assistant Bishop of Birmingham throughout) until his retirement in 1937.

Notes and references

External links 

 Documents by Arthur Hamilton Baynes from Project Canterbury

1854 births
1942 deaths
20th-century Church of England clergy
Vicars of St Mary's Church, Nottingham
Provosts and Deans of Birmingham
Anglican bishops of Natal
Anglican bishops of Maritzburg